Priamo della Quercia (c. 1400 – 1467) was an Italian painter and miniaturist of the early Renaissance. He was the brother of the famous sculptor Jacopo della Quercia.

External links

Italian Paintings: Sienese and Central Italian Schools, a collection catalog containing information about Quercia and his works (see index; plate 50–51).

1467 deaths
15th-century Italian painters
Italian male painters
Painters from Siena
15th-century births
Manuscript illuminators